The 1901 Primera División was the second official championship of the Uruguayan football history.

Overview
The tournament consisted of a round-robin championship of all against all. It involved five teams, after allowing the entry of Club Nacional de Football to the competition. The champion was Central Uruguay Railway Cricket Club (CURCC).

Teams

League standings

References
Uruguay – List of final tables (RSSSF)

Uruguayan Primera División seasons
1901 in South American football leagues
1901 in Uruguayan football